The Wren Building is the signature building of the College of William & Mary in Williamsburg, Virginia. Along with the Brafferton and President's House, these buildings form the College's "Ancient Campus." With a construction history dating to 1695, it is the oldest academic building in continuous use in the United States and among the oldest buildings in Virginia. It was designated a National Historic Landmark in 1960.

Construction of the first building on this site began August 8, 1695 and was completed by 1700.  The building, along with the rest of the historic courtyard, was built using enslaved labor. After several fires and rebuildings, the Wren Building was the first major building restored or reconstructed by John D. Rockefeller, Jr., after he and the Reverend Dr. W.A.R. Goodwin began Colonial Williamsburg's restoration in the late 1920s. The building's current state dates to the 20th-century restoration by Boston architects Perry Shaw & Hepburn. The College named the building in honor of the English architect Sir Christopher Wren, after the Reverend Hugh Jones, a William and Mary mathematics professor, wrote in 1724 that the College Building was "modeled by Sir Christopher Wren". However, it is unknown how Jones came to this conclusion, since there are no actual documents tying Sir Christopher Wren to the design of the building; he never even visited North America. Perry Shaw and Hepburn's restoration reflects the building's historic appearance from its reconstruction in 1716 after a 1705 fire to 1859, when it burned again.

The building is constructed out of red brick in the style of Flemish and English Bond, as was typical for official buildings in 17th- and 18th-century Williamsburg, including several walls remaining from previous structures, and it contains classrooms, offices, a refectory (known as the Great Hall), kitchen, and a chapel (added as a south wing in 1732). The crypt beneath the chapel is the resting place of several notable Virginians, including royal governor Norborne Berkeley, 4th Baron Botetourt, Speaker of the House of Burgesses Sir John Randolph, and his son Peyton Randolph, the first President of the Continental Congress.

On the top of the building is a weather vane with the number 1693, the year the College was founded. In the early 1770s, plans were drawn up to complete the building as a quadrangle. Alumnus Thomas Jefferson (class of 1762) drew up a floorplan submitted to Governor Dunmore and foundations were laid in 1774. The looming War of Independence halted further construction, however, and the fourth wing was never completed. The foundations, however, still exist and were uncovered during excavations in 2014.

The first and second floors of the building are still open for public viewing. Guided tours of the Wren Building are offered whenever classes are in-session by the Spotswood Society, named after the influential Virginia governor, Alexander Spotswood. The Spotswood Society also maintains a virtual tour. In 2021, the Office of Historic Campus was disbanded.

Uses of the building
The Wren Building is the oldest extant building constructed for use by a college or university in the United States, ahead of runner-up Massachusetts Hall at Harvard.  The Wren Building, previously known simply as "The College" or "The Main Building" was effectively the school's only academic building until the completion of the Brafferton building and President's House in the 1720s and 1730s. The campus only began its westward expansion in the first part of the twentieth century.  Students studied, attended religious services, and lived in the Wren Building. In addition, at least eight students brought their enslaved people at the cost of room and board. After the destruction of Virginia's former capital of Jamestown, Virginia's legislature met in the building's Great Hall as a temporary meeting place from 1700 to 1704 while the Capitol was under construction. In fact, the College was critical to Williamsburg becoming the new capital of Virginia after William & Mary students made speeches on May 1, 1699 from the College Building about how they would help build the town to its full potential. When the Capitol burned in 1747, the legislature moved back into the building until the Capitol was reconstructed in 1754.  The building also housed a grammar school and an Indian school, which was moved to the Brafferton building, in 1723.  The building was used as a military hospital by the French during the American Revolutionary War and by the Confederacy during the American Civil War.

The Wren Building today has historical and ceremonial importance in addition to its academic use. Each year during the opening convocation ceremony, incoming William and Mary freshmen enter the building from the courtyard, pass through the central hall, and exit on the opposite side.  As seniors, students pass through the building in the opposite direction on their way to the graduation ceremony. The Yule Log Ceremony, the College's holiday celebration, is held every year at the Wren Building, typically during the second weekend in December. Each fall incoming freshmen take the school's Honor Code Pledge in the building's Great Hall. The Bishop James Madison Society, the College's second-oldest secret society, is rumored to meet in the Wren Building.

Historic setting

After the completion of the President's House and the added chapel wing in 1732, the College's layout and overall architectural organization changed little until the construction of additional academic buildings in the early-twentieth century. For nearly one hundred and fifty years, the campus consisted of the three buildings- the Wren Building, the Brafferton, and the President's House- proportionally arranged in the College yard. With the Wren Building (or "College" as it was called) placed in the middle and bounded by the Brafferton to the south and the President's House to the north, the view gave visitors a sense of balance and proportion, important tenets of the Enlightenment and visible in Jacobean, Anglo-Dutch, and Georgian architecture of the period. To complete the view, a formal geometric garden of hedge rows, topiaries, planting beds, and marl paths was laid out in the College yard facing Duke of Gloucester Street, and a botanical and scientific garden was laid in the back, which led to acres of woodlands and streams. Archaeological and historical evidence points to the formal garden in the front having been destroyed by the late-eighteenth century. Plans drawn up by French engineers of Williamsburg in 1782 show plain rectangular beds ornamenting the front, and later nineteenth-century engravings and photographs show rows of trees and even cows lounging in the College yard. Any remaining physical trace of the gardens were finally obliterated in 1862, when massive earthworks were built during the Siege of Williamsburg. However, it is worth noting that the Brafferton Building was most likely facing the opposite way and was therefore excluded from this garden area.

Recorded descriptions of the grounds appearance are few. One possible view was discovered in the late-1920s when researchers discovered a ca. 1747 printing plate in England's Bodleian Library depicting Williamsburg landmarks, including the College. Although this "Bodleian Plate" served as the blueprint for the Wren Building's restoration in the 1920s and 1930s, little was known about the plate's authenticity with regard to the gardens until College archaeologists and students began digging for evidence in 2005. Since these initial archaeological discoveries, the Bodleian Plate has proved remarkably faithful in its depiction of the College yard's early garden layout.

Although the two side structures are not entirely balanced (there is a slight size discrepancy between the Brafferton and President's House), the sight of the College would have been impressive for an 18th-century Virginian. Native- and foreign-born visitors alike marveled at the College's design.

Slavery

Following the usage of enslaved labor in the construction of the Wren Building, enslaved persons were utilized in a variety of roles by the college, including as chefs, gardeners, and laborers. These enslaved men and women were most likely overseen by one specific man, or perhaps the housekeeper. The building of the Wren Building was also funded by enslaved labor, since the funds for William and Mary that were provided in the 1693 royal charter were funds from a tobacco plantation.

Enslaved individuals were also a means of revenue. When William & Mary lost its funding from the monarchy because of the American Revolution, the Virginia Gazette published a statute passed at a meeting of the Board of Visitors which emphasized how the Visitors intended to use the sale of slaves to compensate for this loss of funding: “A sufficient number of slaves shall be reserved for cleaning the College; and if any remain after such reservation, and hiring of the slaves belonging to the garden and kitchen, as aforesaid, they shall be hired out at publick auction.” In the early part of the nineteenth century, the College gave its few slaves a dollar each for Christmas, and it is known from the record that the dollars were mailed to each slave as the College also paid postage. William & Mary itself owned a plantation, the Nottoway Quarter, which ran on enslaved labor, starting in 1718 with seventeen enslaved people. The proceeds from the sale of tobacco helped to fund the College and scholarships. It was sold in 1802.

The Spotswood Society works with the Lemon Project: A Journey of Reconciliation, which is a project created in 2009 in an attempt to “rectify wrongs perpetrated against African Americans by the College through action or inaction.” A display discussing the college's ties with slavery was erected in the building's information center in 2019. A bronze tablet also was erected to honor those who fought in the Civil War, replacing the 1914 marble plaque that listed the names of only the students and faculty who fought in the Confederacy. The new marble plaque contains all the names of the Union and Confederate soldiers.

Fires

The building has been gutted by fire three times (1705, 1859, and 1862). The first fire was accidental and began in a basement in the North Wing of the building in 1705. Reconstruction after this fire, commanded by Governor Alexander Spotswood, was completed by 1716 with partial funds from Queen Anne. A second fire ravaged the building in 1859, and when it was rebuilt, the Wren Building had a newly fashionable Italianate design. In this fire, a man at the school accused the enslaved people of starting the fire, due to their use of candlelight. However, another man defended the enslaved individuals, stating that he had seen their candle go out prior to the fire. A third fire was set intentionally by Federal troops during the Civil War in 1862. Each reconstruction incorporated the surviving exterior walls, but the overall look of the building has varied considerably over time.

Sir John Randolph, a Speaker of the House of Burgesses, an Attorney General for the Colony of Virginia, and the youngest son of William Randolph and Mary Isham, was interred at the chapel of the Wren Building after his death in 1737. After the burial vaults were disturbed in the 1859 fire, a physician who examined the contents of Randolph's tomb discovered the bones of Randolph and an unknown second person.

Botetourt statue

Popular Virginia Governor Norborne Berkeley, 4th Baron Botetourt, better known as Lord Botetourt, who died in office in 1770 and had been a member of the College's Board of Visitors, was buried in the crypt under the building's chapel. A statue of Lord Botetourt was acquired by William and Mary in 1797 and moved to the campus from the former Capitol building in 1801. Previously displayed in the piazza of the Capitol Building at the opposite end of Duke of Gloucester Street, the statue was a landmark in front of the building for several centuries. After years of weathering, it was removed in 1958 and in 1966 was placed in its new location inside the College's Swem Library. In 1993, as the College celebrated its Tercentenary (300th anniversary), a new statue of Lord Botetourt, created in bronze by William and Mary alumnus Gordon Kray, was installed in the College Yard, in the place occupied for so many years by the original.

Priorities of the College

A large plaque was presented by the Association for the Preservation of Virginia Antiquities in 1914 which lists some of the notable firsts for William and Mary:
First college in the United States, the claim being that its antecedents go back to the college proposed at Henrico (1619).
First American college to receive its charter from the Crown under the Seal of the Privy Council, in 1693. Hence it was known as "their Majesties' Royal College of William and Mary."
First and only American college to receive a colonial Coat-of-Arms from the College of Arms in London, 1694.
First college in the United States to have a full Faculty, consisting of a President, six Professors, usher; and writing master, 1729.
First college to confer medallic prizes; the gold medals donated by Lord Botetourt in 1771.
First college to establish an inter-collegiate fraternity, the Phi Beta Kappa, December 5, 1776.
First college to have the Elective system of study, 1779.
First college to have the Honor System (inked by Thomas Jefferson), 1779.
First college to become a University, 1779.
First college to have a school of Modern Languages, 1779.
First college to include Fine Arts in a professorship, 1779.
First college to have a school of Municipal and Constitutional Law, 1779.
First college to teach Political Economy, 1784.
First college to have a school of Modern History, 1803.

See also
List of the oldest buildings in the United States
Wren Cross controversy
List of National Historic Landmarks in Virginia
National Register of Historic Places listings in Williamsburg, Virginia

References

External links

William & Mary College, Main Building, College Yard, Williamsburg, Williamsburg, VA: 4 photos, 14 measured drawings, and 5 data pages at Historic American Buildings Survey
William and Mary — History of the Wren Building
Colonial Williamsburg — Wren Building

1700 establishments in Virginia
18th-century Church of England church buildings
College of William & Mary buildings
Colonial Williamsburg
Christopher Wren buildings
Historic American Buildings Survey in Virginia
National Historic Landmarks in Virginia
National Register of Historic Places in Williamsburg, Virginia
School buildings completed in 1700
University and college buildings on the National Register of Historic Places in Virginia